"This Is Not America" is a song by English singer David Bowie and American jazz fusion band Pat Metheny Group, taken from the soundtrack to the 1985 film The Falcon and the Snowman. It was released as a single in February 1985, reaching number 14 in the United Kingdom and number 32 in the United States.

Background and recording
Having finished his 1984 album Tonight and being dissatisfied with it, Bowie began a series of soundtrack projects (Labyrinth, Absolute Beginners, and When the Wind Blows, all in 1986) that started with this collaboration with the Pat Metheny Group. Recorded in late 1984, "This Is Not America" was released as a single in early 1985 and on the soundtrack to the movie. Metheny had written an instrumental piece for the movie called "Chris" and wanted to turn that into a full-length song; "This Is Not America" was the result of their collaboration. Bowie watched an early screening of the movie and took notes on lines and themes that they might use; "This is not America" is a line said by one character to another, and both Bowie and Metheny agreed it was interesting. Despite Metheny being known as a jazz musician, the song was described by Bowie biographer Chris O'Leary as "hardly a jazz piece", as Metheny plays a simple rhythm guitar throughout the song, with no solos or improvisations. Metheny later noted that Bowie's lyrics were "profound and meaningful—and absolutely perfect for the film." 

Bowie does not appear in the corresponding music video for the single, as it was made up entirely of clips from the movie.

Other appearances
The song appeared on The Singles Collection (1993). The 1995 reissue of Bowie's 1984 album Tonight includes "This Is Not America" as a bonus track. "This Is Not America" appears as a B-side to Bowie's 1997 single "I Can't Read". It was also released on Best of Bowie (2002), appearing on all but the Australian and Japanese pressings of that album, The Platinum Collection (2005), The Best of David Bowie 1980/1987 (2007), Nothing Has Changed (2014; two-disc and three-disc editions), Bowie Legacy (2016; two-disc edition), and Loving the Alien (1983–1988) (2018; box set).

A remix by The Scumfrog was released on Club Bowie (2003), and the song was also performed in Bowie's musical "Lazarus" (2016). A cast recording from the musical, which also included a performance of the song, was released in October 2016.

Live versions
Pat Metheny Group recorded the song live for the 1995 DVD We Live Here, with band members replacing Bowie on vocals. Bowie recorded a performance of the song at BBC Radio Theatre in London on 27 June 2000, and it was released on the bonus disc accompanying the first release of Bowie at the Beeb; a re-mastered and complete version of that show was re-released in 2021 as part of the Bowie box set Brilliant Adventure (1992-2001). Another version featuring Anna Maria Jopek and Pat Metheny was recorded live in Warsaw in 2002, and is included on the album Anna Maria Jopek and Pat Metheny Live in Warsaw 2002.

"American Dream"
Bowie performs a variation of "This Is Not America" on the P. Diddy song "American Dream" for the soundtrack to the 2001 film Training Day. Bowie said, "This version's definitely got a menace. ... There's a fast techno flavour to it. It's got an aggression to it that really reflects the movie."

Track listing
7-inch and 12-inch single
A. "This Is Not America" – 3:51
B. "This Is Not America" (instrumental) – 3:51

Credits and personnel
Credits adapted from the liner notes of The Falcon and the Snowman: Original Motion Picture Soundtrack.

 David Bowie – vocals, songwriting
 Pat Metheny – guitars, production, songwriting
 Lyle Mays – keyboards, production, songwriting
 Steve Rodby – bass
 Paul Wertico – drums, percussion
 Bob Clearmountain – mixing
 Bob Ludwig – mastering engineering

Charts

Weekly charts

Year-end charts

References

Bibliography
 
 
 

1980s ballads
1985 singles
1985 songs
David Bowie songs
Dutch Top 40 number-one singles
EMI Records singles
Songs written by David Bowie
Songs written for films
Jazz fusion songs